Aral Talim Airport is an airport in Aral, Xinjiang, China. It is located in Tanan, 12km south from Aral. The airport opened on June 16, 2022.

Facilities 
Aral Talim Airport is a category 4C airport. It has a runway 2,800 meters long and 45 meters wide, a 4,509 square-meter terminal building and 6 gates. It is capable of handling 300,000 passengers, 1,100 tons of cargo, and 3,200 flights a year.

Airlines and destinations

See also
List of airports in China
List of the busiest airports in China

References

Airports in Xinjiang